Alzoniella pellitica is a species of very small aquatic snail, a spring snail, an operculate gastropod mollusc in the family Hydrobiidae.

Description

Distribution

References

Alzoniella
Hydrobiidae
Gastropods described in 2007